MTV Fakta was a Finnish documentary channel owned and operated by MTV3. It started broadcasting in November 2006.

References

External links 
 MTV Fakta – Official site 

Defunct television channels in Finland
Television channels and stations established in 2006
Bonnier Group
Television channels and stations disestablished in 2016